Franz Barten (26 January 1912 – 4 August 1944) was a World War II fighter ace from Germany. He was born on 26 January 1912 at Saarbrücken. Barten was credited with having shot down a total of 55 Allied aircraft.

On 4 August 1944, Barten was shot down in a Messerschmitt Bf 109 in aerial combat with P-47 Thunderbolt belonging to the United States Army Air Forces near Rheinsehlen. He bailed out of his aircraft, but was shot while hanging in his parachute.

Awards
Ehrenpokal der Luftwaffe awarded on 20 October 1941
German Cross in Gold awarded on 22 May 1942 as Oberfeldwebel in the 11./Jagdgeschwader 51
Knight's Cross of the Iron Cross awarded posthumously on 24 October 1944 as Staffelkapitän in the III./Jagdgeschwader 53.

References

Citations

Bibliography

 
 
 
 

1912 births
1944 deaths
Luftwaffe pilots
German World War II flying aces
Luftwaffe personnel killed in World War II
Recipients of the Gold German Cross
Recipients of the Knight's Cross of the Iron Cross
Aviators killed by being shot down
People from Saarbrücken
Military personnel from Saarland